Right from the Heart is an album by the American pop singer Johnny Mathis that was released on March 18, 1985, by Columbia Records. It was his first album without songs that were previously recorded by other artists. The title track is one of the album's four ballads that, along with four of the remaining six up-tempo tracks, delve into the subject of relationships, but it is the synth-driven "Step by Step" and the anthemic "Hold On" on which Mathis take a break from the usual focus on love songs. The former offers the hope that can be found in change that comes gradually until "I can see the way free from yesterday to a new beginning". The latter stresses the importance of being oneself: "Life is a party. Why don't you come the way you are?"

Even though the title track was used on the ABC soap opera Ryan's Hope, the album did not make it onto Billboard magazine's  Top Pop Albums chart. The song "Right from the Heart" did reach number 38 during its two weeks on the magazine's list of the 40 Hot Adult Contemporary songs of the week in the US in May that year.

Ryan's Hope cameos
In 1985, Mathis guest starred on the daytime drama Ryan's Hope in the April 9 and May 1 episodes, the latter of which included a performance of the song "Right from the Heart". In the plot of the show, Dave Greenberg (Scott Holmes) has written the song, and Katie Ryan Thompson (Julia Campbell) "takes the song to Mathis in the hope he'll record it". Mathis lip syncs to his recording of the song as he pretends to be recording the song in a recording studio while the characters look on from the control room.

Reception
People magazine gave the album a mixed review, noting the up-tempo songs, "such as "Touch by Touch", on which Mathis forces it a little". Lamenting the lack of duets, the reviewer wrote that "he has had such success doing them", and this is his first studio album since 1977 that has not included one. The reviewer does praise the title track as "vintage Mathis" and asserts that "there's still nobody better when it comes to creating a warm, relaxed, mellow mood".

Track listing
From the liner notes for the original album:

1. "Touch by Touch" (Brent Mason, Keith Stegall) – 4:21
 
2. "Love Shock" (Michel Colombier, Denny Diante, Kathy Wakefield) – 4:19
 
3. "Just One Touch" (Robbie Buchanan, Diane Warren) – 4:02
 
4. "Hooked on Goodbye" (Colombier, Diante, Wakefield) – 4:02
 
5. "I Need You (The Journey)" (Colombier, Wakefield) – 5:09
 
6. "Step by Step" (Brian Fairweather, Wakefield) – 4:34
 
7. "Right from the Heart" from Ryan's Hope (Earl Rose, Wakefield) – 4:25
 
8. "Falling in Love" (Douglas Getschal, John Robinson) – 4:28
 
9. "Here We Go Again" (Dave DeLuca, Marvin Morrow) – 4:04
 
10. "Hold On" (Colombier, Diante, Wakefield) – 4:31

Recording dates
From the liner notes for The Voice of Romance: The Columbia Original Album Collection:
June 29, 1984 – "Hold On", "Touch by Touch"
July 19, 1984 – "Here We Go Again"
July 27, 1984 – "Falling in Love", "Hooked on Goodbye"
August 14, 1984 – "Just One Touch"
October 24, 1984 – "I Need You (The Journey)"
December 6, 1984 – "Step by Step"
January 3, 1985 – "Love Shock"
February 8, 1985 – "Right from the Heart"

Personnel
From the liner notes for the original album:

Johnny Mathis – vocals
Denny Diante – producer
Michel Colombier – arranger (except as noted)
Robbie Buchanan – arranger ("Just One Touch")
Brian Fairweather – arranger ("Step by Step")
Douglas Getschal – arranger ("Falling in Love")
John Robinson – arranger ("Falling in Love")
Mick Guzauski – recording engineer, mixing engineer
Bernie Grundman – mastering engineer
Jules Chaikin – string and horn contractor
Sidney Weiss – concertmaster
Jo-Anne McGettrick – production coordinator
Mikey & Friends – wardrobe
David Vance – photographer
Mastered at Bernie Grundman Mastering, Hollywood, California
Mixed at Conway Studios, Hollywood, California, using the GML Automation System

Peter Chaikin – additional engineer
Ed Cherney – additional engineer
Larry Hirsch – additional engineer
Peggy McCreary – additional engineer
Jeremy Smith – additional engineer
Frank Wolf – additional engineer
Erik Zobler – additional engineer
Terry Christian – second engineer
Rick Clifford – second engineer
Bill Jackson – second engineer
Richard McKernan (Conway Studios) – second engineer
Sharon Rice (The Complex) – second engineer
Steve Shelton (Sunset Sound Studios) – second engineer

References

Bibliography

 

1985 albums
Johnny Mathis albums
Columbia Records albums
Albums recorded at Sunset Sound Recorders